Christian Rapp (born 1964 in Vienna) is an Austrian author, cultural scientist and exhibition curator.

Life 
Christian Rapp studied theater, media, and art history at the University of Vienna. From 1988 to 1990 he was cultural editor of the "AZ" and the courier. Christian Rapp has been working as an exhibition curator since 1990, focusing on urban history, contemporary history, traffic and tourism history. He curated exhibitions for the Technical Museum Vienna, the Vienna Museum, the Jewish Museum Vienna, the Lower Austrian Provincial Exhibition and others. In 1995 he was with the work  Höhenrausch. The German mountain film  zum Dr. phil. PhD. Since 2002 he is a lecturer at the Institute for European Ethnology of the University of Vienna. From 2004 to 2008 he was a lecturer in the postgraduate course "ECM-Exhibition and Cultural Communication Management" of the University of Applied Arts Vienna.
On 1 January 2018 he followed Stefan Karner as scientific director in the History of Lower Austria and   Rapp becomes new leader in the House of History .

Publications 
 Höhenrausch. Der deutsche Bergfilm. Sonderzahl, Wien um 1997, .
 with Ulrike Felber, Elke Krasny: Smart Exports. Österreich auf den Weltausstellungen 1851–2000. Brandstätter, Wien 2000, .
 with Wolfgang Kos: Alt-Wien: die Stadt, die niemals war. Czernin, Wien 2004, .
 with Nadia Rapp-Wimberger: Arbeite, Sammle, Vermehre. Von der ersten Oesterreichischen Spar-Casse zur Erste Bank. Brandstätter, Wien 2005, .
 Spurwechsel. Wien lernt Auto fahren. Brandstätter, Wien 2006,  (Ausstellungskatalog: Technisches Museum, Wien, 12. Oktober 2006 – 28. Februar 2007)
 with Elke Doppler, Sándor Békési (Hrsg.): Am Puls der Stadt. 2000 Jahre Karlsplatz. Czernin, Wien 2008, .
 with Matthias Beitl, Nadia Rapp-Wimberger (Hrsg.): Wer hat, der hat. Eine illustrierte Geschichte des Sparens. Metro, Wien 2009, .
 with Markus Kristan: Worauf freut sich der Wiener wenn er vom Urlaub kommt? Ankerbrot. Die Geschichte einer großen Bäckerei. Brandstätter, Wien 2011, .
 with Nadia Rapp-Wimberger: Bad Ischl – Mit und ohne Kaiser. Brandstätter, Wien 2016, .

Exhibitions 
 with Elke Krasny, Nadia Rapp-Wimberger: Von Samoa zum Isonzo. Die Fotografin und Reisejournalistin Alice Schalek. Jüdisches Museum Wien, 1999.
 with Gertraud Liesenfeld, Klara Löffler, Michael Weese: Nichtstun. Vom Flanieren, Pausieren, Blaumachen und Müssiggehen. Österreichisches Museum für Volkskunde Wien, 2000.
 with Wolfgang Kos: Alt Wien. Die Stadt, die niemals war. Wien Museum 2004.
 Spurwechsel – Wien lernt Autofahren. Technisches Museum Wien 2005.
 with Nadia Rapp-Wimberger: Österreichische Riviera – Wien entdeckt das Meer. Wien Museum 2013.
 with Peter Fritz u. a.: Jubel und Elend – Leben mit dem Großen Krieg 1914–1918. Schallaburg 2014.
 Verkehrsmuseum Remise 2014

Footnotes

External links 
 
 Literatur von Christian Rapp im Katalog der Österreichischen Nationalbibliothek

Living people
1964 births
Austrian male writers